La Union, officially the Province of La Union (Kankanaey: Probinsyan di La Union; Ibaloi: Probinsya ne La Union; ; Tagalog: Lalawigan ng La Union), is a province in the Philippines located in the Ilocos Region in the Island of Luzon. Its capital is the City of San Fernando, which also serves as the regional center of the Ilocos Region.

The province is bordered by Ilocos Sur to the north, Benguet to the east, Pangasinan to the south, and to the west by the shores of the South China Sea.

History

Pre-colonial era

During the pre-colonial era, the coastal plains of northwestern La Union and Ilocos Sur stretching from the town of "Tagudan" (Tagudin) in the north to Namacpacan (Luna), Bangar, "Basnutan" (Bacnotan), and "Purao" or "Puraw" (Balaoan) in the south, and along the riverbanks of the Amburayan River – were the early settlement of the “Samtoy” or the "Ilocanos" in La Union.

Thus according to William Henry Scott, “the northern section of La Union was an emporium and renowned for the exchange of Igorot gold and gold mines”, involving merchants often from the Chinese, Japanese, Igorots, and Tagalogs during the early settlement period. Rice, cotton, gold, wax, iron, glass beads, silk (abel), honey, ceramics, and stoneware jars known as burnáy were all traded goods."

Furthermore, the southern coastal section of La Union was identified as “Aroo” or “Agoho” (Agoo). Agoo was the northern section of Caboloan (Pangasinan), and a settlement of people of the "same race as those of Pangasinan, encompassing the settlements of "Atuley" (San Juan)",San Fernando", "Bauang", "Caba", the settlement of "Alingay or Alinguey" (Aringay), "Santo Tomas", and "Rosario".

These people traded actively trading with their Ilocano and Igorot neighbors and traders from China, Japan and Southeast Asia for a long time before the age of colonization, as evidenced by the porcelain and pottery excavated from the site of the Catholic church during its renovation and now housed in the Museo de Iloko.

Later, Japanese traders and fisher folk arrived in the Philippines and established a settlement. La Union's coast was shaped in such a way at the time that it provided a good harbor for foreign vessels entering Lingayen Gulf.

In the highlands of La Union is home of the Igorot people mainly the Kankaney and Ibaloi

Spanish colonial era

A year after Adelantado Miguel Lopez de Legazpi made Manila the capital of the Philippines on June 24, 1571, the Spaniards started the colonization in Northern Luzon “to pacify the people in it”

In June, 1572, the conquistadores led by Juan de Salcedo (grandson of Legazpi) sailing the Angalakan River and landed in “Aroo” or “Agoho” present Agoo, then a part of Pangasinan. Juan de Salcedo saw three Japanese ships, he tracked them down until they landed in a Japanese settlement. The Japanese were permitted to stay after paying tribute. As a result of the incident, Agoo was dubbed "El Puerto de Japon" or "Japanese Port”, because enterprising Japanese and Chinese merchants have been trading with the natives through this port. Agoo was highly involved in commerce with other Southeast Asian countries in the region.

In her book "Pangasinan 1572–1800," Rosario Mendoza-Cortes states that La Union specifically Agoo was the region's principal port of call for Japanese and Chinese traders, with Sual, Pangasinan, as the only other contender. This was due to the presence of a Japanese colony. Traders at Agoo, after all, would have access to a larger number of people, and it was closer to China and Japan. The principal export from the region was deer pelts, which were shipped to Japan. When the Spanish closed the Philippines to foreign trade, Agoo's function as an ancient port began to deteriorate. When the port of Agoo was eventually closed, the Japanese would leave, but not before teaching the locals about fish farming, rice cultivation, deerskin tanning, duck breeding, and weapon production.

The Spaniards marched up north without any resistance. They had their first taste of the Ilocanos' bravery and fighting heart during a historic Battle in Purao (literally, "white" and maybe due to the white sands of the beach) now known as Balaoan. The Spaniards befriended the Ilocanos who reluctantly acceded to Spanish rule.

A secret society of insurrectos was organized in the town of Balaoan. Its purpose was to fight and revolt against the Spanish Government in the area. On the eve of the revolution, a traitor told the Spanish of their plan. The Spanish soldiers, without any investigation, arrested seven members of the secret society and executed them the same night. Only one, Fernando Ostrea, escaped with leg wounds. He informed the people about what had happened. In memory of the seven Martyrs, a masonic lodge, Siete Martires Lodge No. 177, was organized.

Formation in 1850 
La Union was formed on March 2, 1850, and became the 34th province of the Philippines from Cebu-1565.

After Cebu became the first provincia in 1565, new provinces have been created by the Spaniards. Three main functions were considered so: political-civil administration, ecclesiastical governance and geographical considerations. For more than two and one-half centuries, the original llocos province remained intact until 1818 when it split into llocos Norte and Ilocos Sur. In 1846, Abra was created by Governor General Narciso Zaldua Claveria.

Governor General Claveria was a visionary administrator. He believed that combining three contiguous areas that are far from their respective provincial capitals was a viable solution to the demands of political-civil administration. He also saw the territory's agricultural and commercial growth potentials. And the kicker was the extension of Hispanic civilization and Christianity to the area. Bangar, Namacpacan (Luna) and Balaoan in the southern portion of llocos Sur was quite a distance from the cabezera of Vigan and in almost like manner, Sto. Tomas, Agoo, Aringay, Caba, Bauang, Naguilian, San Fernando, San Juan and Bacnotan were that far from Pangasinan's capital of Lingayen. The 40–45 rancherias in the depths of Central Cordillera of the Benguet (Eastern Pais del Igorotes) district bordered by the three Ilocos Sur towns and the nine of Pangasinan have even worse problems.

Thus on October 29, 1849, Governor General Claveria signed the proposal (promovido) to unite the Pangasinan-Ilocos-Cordillera areas into a new province called La Union (the official name designated by Claveria himself). For 124 days, high and important Spanish colonial officers studied and deliberated on the proposition to create La Union or not. On March 2, 1850, Governor General Antonio Maria Blanco signed the Superior Decreto that founded La Union – the 34th province since the founding of Cebu in 1565. It was classified as a gobierno politico-militar (Political-Military Government). Blanco appointed, on March 4, 1850, Captain Toribio Ruiz de la Escalera (Claveria's former trusted aide de camp) as the first Gobernador Military y Politico. La Union is the union of lands, people, cultures and resources. On April 18, 1854, Queen Isabella II of Spain issued the royal decree (real orden) from Madrid confirming Blanco's Superior Decreto.

By 1860, there was a dramatic progress in commerce and agriculture in the province primarily because of Tobacco. Spanish authorities banked on the prized leaf for further economic development. The industry was so lucrative that a Tobacco Monopoly was established. All Tobacco leaves were strictly monitored and bought exclusively by the government at a fixed price.

1898 Philippine Revolution

By 1896, the people of La Union had enough of the Spanish atrocities. The torture of the native priests, Padres Adriano Garces of Balaoan, Mariano Gaerlan of San Fernando and Mariano Dacanay of Bacnotan; the execution of the Balaoan Siete Martires, a majority of whom are ancestors of former La Union Board Member Joaquin C. Ostrea Jr.; the persecution of Masons, whose membership included the elite natives; and others have all the more agitated the people to unite and fight their masters for three centuries.

On May 22, 1898, a gunshot killed the much-hated Friar Mariano Garcia of Santo Tomas, it was a shot heard in the whole province which eventually ignited the revolution in what the Spaniards used to call, "Una Provincia Modelo".

Led by Manuel Tinio y Bondoc, a boy general under the command of General Emilio Aguinaldo, the Spaniards were finally defeated in La Union, some of whom escaped and sought refuge in Vigan. With the help of the Americans, the Filipinos were finally freed from Spain only to find out later that they will be subjected to a new colonial rule.

A Revolutionary Government was established with Aguinaldo as president. Tinio acted as de facto governor of La Union but was later on replaced by Dr. Lucino Almeida as Presidente Provincial.

American colonial era

During the American occupation, Dr. Almeida was reappointed as provincial chief, only to be convicted and exiled after his revolutionary connections were discovered. In defense of their hard-fought freedom, the people of La Union resisted American power and maintained their allegiance to Aguinaldo. Due however to the superior American military firepower, the whole province and the whole archipelago were finally subdued and pacified.

The Americans prioritized education during their rule. Schools were massively constructed, and public education attracted the Filipinos. Democracy, which was given equal importance, facilitated the election of La Union's first Civil Governor in 1901 in the person of Don Joaquín Joaquino Ortega. Nine other equally able governors followed Don Joaquin before the outbreak of World War II: Joaquín Luna 1904–1907, Sixto Zandueta 1908–1919, Pío Ancheta 1919–1922, Thomas de Guzmán 1922 1923, 1928–1931, Juan Lucero 1923–1929, Mauro Ortiz 1931–1934 , Juan Rivera 1934–1937, Francisco Nisce 1937–1940 and Bernardo Gapuz 1940. Just as when the Filipinos were awaiting independence, as promised by the Americans under the Tydings-Mcduffie Law, World War II exploded.

World War II

La Union had great strategic significance for both Allied and Japanese forces. The Filipinos fought side by side with the Americans. Amid the chaos and anarchy, three provincial chieftains rose to the occasion to lead the people of La Union, Gov. Bernardo Gapuz (1940), Gov. Jorge Camacho (1941–1942) and Gov. Bonifacio Tadiar (1942–1944).

Battle of Rosario (Japanese Invasion of Lingayen Gulf)

On December 22, 1941, the Japanese 4th Tank Regiment and the 47th Infantry Regiment under the command of Col. Isamu Yanagi, supported by a massive flotilla of navy ships tried to land in Agoo to make it one of three major beachheads for the Japanese Invasion of Lingayen Gulf, although weather dispersed their forces and made them deploy on a wide stretch of beach that ranged from Poro Point (San Fernando) to as far south as Damortis. These forces later met the commonwealth defence forces—consisting of the 26th Cavalry Regiment (Philippine Scouts), the Philippine 21st Division, the Philippine 11th Division, and the newly formed Philippine 71st Division—in what would later be called the Battle of Rosario.

Bacnotan

Invading Japanese soldiers arrived at Bacnotan on December 21, 1941, during the early days of World War II. On January 4, 1945, the tides of war changed in La Union as Filipino-American soldiers captured Baroro Bridge in Bacnotan, a strategic bridge that connects the rest of Northern Luzon to San Fernando. The victory ensured the liberation of La Union. It was followed by the historic Battle of San Fernando and Bacsil Ridge. Defeated, the Japanese Imperial Army retreated to Baguio where they joined their comrades and made their last stand.

The Battle of Bacsil Ridge

The Battle of Bacsil Ridge was fought in March 1945 was one of the continued main battles of the Philippines Campaign of the Second World War are between the Filipino soldiers under the 121st Infantry Regiment, Philippine Commonwealth Army, USAFIP-NL, under the command of Russell W. Volckmann, and the Japanese Imperial forces under by General Tomoyuki Yamashita.

The Battle of Bacsil Ridge ended the month-long battle for control of San Fernando. The Japanese defenders called the Hayashi Detachment, composed of 3,000 armed troops and 2,000 unarmed support forces, took hold of San Fernando and its surrounding areas which denied entry to the port of the city and a road leading to Baguio. As part of the San Fernando-Bacsil Operations, the 1st Battalion of 121st Infantry were sent to loosen the enemy positions starting late February with the assistance of the Allied Air Force.

The 1st Battalion made a general attack to the ridge on 16 March 1945 and fought the Japanese defenders until the capture of Bacsil on 19 March. On the same day, the 3rd battalion captured the Reservoir Hill. The Battle of Bacsil Ridge between the Filipino soldiers and recognized guerrillas and the Japanese Forces resulted in the recapture of the city of San Fernando, La Union. Which resulted in the capture of San Fernando, La Union on 23 March 1945, and Bacnotan, La Union and the military offensive throughout the province ended on 24 March after two months of fighting.

Liberation of Bauang

The Liberation of Bauang, La Union was part of the San Fernando-Bascil operations aimed to liberate the province of La Union and open one of the roads to Baguio. Units from Rosario, La Union including elements of the 2nd Battalion, 121st Infantry of the United States Army Forces in the Philippines – Northern Luzon (USAFIP-NL) under the command of Major Diego Sipin, were tasked to make the northward advance to Bauang. The 2nd Battalion, 121st Infantry, USAFIP-NL reinforce the other battalions in the efforts to capture San Fernando. Meanwhile, combat units from the “B” company, 1st Battalion, 121st Infantry, USAFIP-NL attacked the defensive lines in Bauang to aid the 1st Battalion, 130th Infantry (US) in its advance from the south. Bauang was first liberated on 19 March 1945, followed by the declaration of the end of operations at La Union on 24 March 1945. On January 4, 1945, La Union was liberated by the Battle of San Fernando and Bacsil Ridge.

As San Fernando was in ruins at the time, Bacnotan became the provisional seat of the province administration after the war. The La Union National High School was also relocated to Bacnotan as a result of this relocation. When things returned to normal, the provincial government was relocated to San Fernando, followed by the La Union National High School. The North Provincial High School was established after the provincial high school in Bacnotan was transferred (now Bacnotan National High School).

Martial Law

Although economically affected by the rapid peso devaluation brought about by unbridled election spending heading into the 1969 presidential elections, political life in La Union was not significantly impacted by Ferdinand Marcos’ declaration of Martial Law in 1972.

The powerful family factions which had dominated La Union politics since before the American colonial era largely remained in place, although the family of Congressman Jose D. Aspiras became much more prominent after he became Marcos’ Tourism Minister. The main political change was the increased power of regional and provincial offices of national agencies, whose directors were answerable directly to Marcos.

This technique used by Marcos to consolidate political power did not get much resistance in the Ilocos Region, including La Union, which had strong ethnic associations with the Marcos family. The Marcos administration's use of violent methods for stifling dissent thus mostly took place in other, non-Ilocano provinces, such as nearby Abra, Kalinga, and Mountain Province.

But there were still La Union natives who were willing to object to the authoritarian practices and abuses of the Marcos administration, despite personal risk. This included San-Fernando-raised student activists Romulo and Armando Palabay, UP Students and La Union National High School alumni who were imprisoned for their protest activities, tortured at Camp Olivas in Pampanga, and later separately killed before the end of Martial Law. Romulo (age 22) and Armando (age 21) were posthumously honored when their names were etched on the Wall of Remembrance at the Philippines' Bantayog ng mga Bayani, which honors the heroes and martyrs who fought the authoritarian regime.

Agoo, La Union, native Antonio L. Mabutas had become Archbishop of Davao by the time of Martial Law, and spoke actively against the human rights abuses of that time, particularly the torture and killings of church workers. The pastoral letter he wrote against Martial law, “Reign of Terror in the Countryside,” is notable for having been the first pastoral to be written against Marcos' martial law administration, and even doubly notable because Mabutas was considered a conservative within the Catholic church heirarchy in the Philippines.

2010s tourism boom 

From the mid-2000s to the early 2010s, an influx of entrepreneurs began putting up establishments such as boho-chic-style art hostels and third-wave coffeeshops in San Juan and Agoo. They were initially attracted to the already-established surfing scene of Barangay Urbiztondo in San Juan, but eventually envisioned business in the province as an alternative to the stresses of city-based employment. This coincided with the phase-by-phase opening of the Tarlac–Pangasinan–La Union Expressway (TPLEX), which made La Union more accessible to tourists from Metro Manila.

Alongside the rising influence of social media outlets Twitter and Instagram, these factors led to a drastic tourism boom that made San Juan—previously been seen as just one of the Philippines' many surfing venues—a major backpacker's destination whose attractions centered on surfing and art.

San Juan began to be featured prominently in independent films such as Jay Abello's 2015 film Flotsam and JP Habac's 2017 film I'm Drunk, I Love You, and the province began to be referred to by the colloquial initialism “ElYu.”

Among Philippines literary circles, the town of Bauang has also become a pilgrimage site of sorts for celebrating the life of and works of writer and World War II martyr Manuel Arguilla, with writers visiting the author's hometown to experience the landscapes that inspired him, and which featured prominently in his stories. The most prominent event celebrating Arguilla was the 2017 run of the Taboan Literary Festival, a celebration of Philippine literature which changes venues every year, organized by the National Commission on Culture and the Arts during every National Arts Month in February. Among the prominent artists who spoke about Arguilla at the festival were writer-academic Butch Dalisay and National Artist of the Philippines for literature Bienvenido Lumbera.

Culture 
The province of La Union is the gateway to the Ilocano people's rich cultural heritage. The province of La Union has a 93% llocano population that is overwhelmingly Roman Catholic. As a matter of fact, La Union culture and traditions are rooted on Ilocano culture and traditions, which have evolved extensively, distinctively, and marvelously over the decades with the influences of neighboring provinces. Pangasinan communities can be found in southern, Igorot tribes, primarily the Ibaloi, Kankanaey, and Bago/Bag-o tribes found in La Union's Cordilleran foothills, and Chinese in the city. La Union, a melting pot of cultures and traditions, is located along the coast of the China Sea, bounded in the south by Pangasinan, in the north by Ilocos Sur, and in the west by Benguet.

La Union was the birthplace of at least two of the most revered figures in Philippine art – writer and World War II hero Manuel Arguilla and National Artist of the Philippines for Music Lucrecia Kasilag.

Abel weaving (Panagabel) 
In the municipality of Bangar is well known for its local loom-weaving industry, which produces the now-famous "Abel Iloko" cloth, a traditional Ilocano fabric that the town has been producing for centuries and is highly praised for its quality and in high demand both locally and internationally. The inabel is one of the many prides of the Philippines' Ilocos region. "Abel" is the Ilocano word for weave, and "inabel" refers to any type of woven fabric. However, in the world of weaving, inabel is specifically used to refer to textiles that are distinctly Ilocano in origin.

Basi winemaking 
The tradition of making “basi” is still prevalent and relevant in the municipality of Naguilian, La Union, where it has been practiced for centuries. Basi is a fermented alcoholic beverage made from “unas” (sugarcane) that, if fermented for a longer time period, turns into “sukang Iloco”. Basi is Naguilians' one town, one product, and the Basi Festival is held annually. Unlike in Ilocos and Pangasinan, the method of making basi in Naguilian is distinct. The Naguilian method entails the preparation of “bubod” or starter, as well as the 24-hour “binubudan” (steamed rice plus starter), boiling sugarcane juice, and additives such as one year old duhat bark, “tangal” bark, and green guava leaves.

Even before the arrival of the Spaniards, Basi was very important in the Ilocanos' society and culture. Drinking basi is an important part of Ilocano culture, from marriage to childbirth to death. It is a part of their rituals, traditions, and daily life. That is why, on September 16, 1807, the Basi Revolt, which lasted 13 days in Piddig, Ilocos Norte, occurred when the Philippines' Spanish rulers effectively prohibited private production of basi wine. The series of unrest also led the colonial government to divide the province into the now Ilocos Norte and Ilocos Sur.

Festivals (Fiestas) 

Festivals in the Philippines allow people to highlight their rich culture whereas paying tribute to history and patron saints. They are vibrant, large, and celebrated with a lot of pomp and show. Every month and every city has its own vibrancy bursting forth from their festivals for at least a week, if not more. Each town in La Union has its own fiesta, and the people of La Union have a strong celebration game. Aside from that, there are several other special festivals held throughout La Union each year:

Pindangan Festival — a festival that  commemorates the founding anniversary of San Fernando as a city, which was ratified in a plebiscite on March 20, 1998. "Pindangan" is an ilocano term for a location where meat is sun-dried. The area was named "Pindangan" because the locals used to make a lot of sun-dried meat (with salt) to preserve it.

Sillag Festival — The much-awaited summer festival in La Union, SILLAG Poro Point Festival of Lights. “Sillag” is an Ilocano word meaning “moonbeam” or “illumination” from the moon. The festival was anchored on that theme-lights-with various activities kicking in as soon as the sun went down at Poro Point.

Diro Festival — "Diro" is an Ilocano word for “honey” that represents unity and oneness for Bacnoteñans. It is also Bacnotans "One Town, One Product" under the DTI program. Officers and staff from the Head Office and the Bacnotan branch participated in the float parade and distributed giveaways to the residents.

Dinengdeng Festival — The Dinengdeng Festival (English: vegetable dish), is the official festivity event of the municipality of Agoo, La Union. It is held annually in summer in celebration of a dish by which its name is derived from. "Dinengdeng", is the Ilocano term for any vegetable-simmered dish. Usually cooked in a "banga", a local term for a cooking clay pot being used by the descendants of the local settlers in the ancient times.

Tinungbo Festival — is an annual celebration in the town of Pugo, La Union. The Tinungbo festival took its name from the local dialect “tinungbo” which is an indigenous way of cooking rice and fresh water and other local delicacies light young bamboo internode, locally called as tubong, grilled over charcoal or low fire.

Timpuyog Festival — a festival that celebrated at the town of Caba, La Union shat show case Caba's one town product bamboo crafts. “Timpuyog” is an Ilocano word for unity, teamwork cooperation and solidarity.

Baggak Festival — Every month of April, the town of Bauang, La Union comes alive to stage this colorful festival. Typically, “Baggak” means “morning star,” in Ilocano and stands for the dawning of a new day for  the Bauangeñians. During this event, it portrays the Ilocano spirit of unity and diversity of culture.

Daing Festival — The town of Santo Tomas is known for its Damortis dried fish (daing stalls along the national highway) local trade, and exports. Daing Festival held every April 20 and annual town Fiesta every April 24 and 25. Its Pamahalaang Bayan (Municipal Town Hall) is nestled on top of a hill.

Basi Festival — is held every first week of May in the town of Naguilian, La Union to celebrate the “basi” an Ilocano traditional wine made from sugarcane which is its namesake. The festival mainly promotes Basi as a local product and the usual activities include street dancing, sport events, agri-trade fair & other amusement games.

Geography
La Union covers a total area of  occupying the centralsouthern section of the Ilocos Region in Luzon. The province is bordered by Ilocos Sur to the north, Benguet to the east, Pangasinan to the south, and to the west by the South China Sea.

Like most of the Ilocos Region, the province is squeezed in by the Cordillera mountain range to the east and the South China Sea to the west. Yet, unlike other portions of Luzon and the Philippines' two other island groupings, the Visayas and Mindanao, La Union experiences a rather arid and prolonged dry season with little precipitation to be expected between the months of November and May.

Administrative divisions
La Union comprises 19 municipalities and 1 component city, all of which are organized into two legislative districts.

Barangays
La Union has a total of 576 barangays comprising its 19 municipalities and 1 city.

The most populous barangay in the province is Sevilla in the City of San Fernando with a population of 10,612 in the 2010 census. If cities are excluded, Central East (Poblacion) in the municipality of Bauang has the highest number of inhabitants, at 4,249. Caggao in Bangar has the lowest with only 170.

Demographics

The province is predominantly Ilocano (over 90% based on recent census data) and Roman Catholic. Communities of Pangasinans thrive mostly in the southwestern portion of the province while Cordillerans live in the Cordillera foothills. In September 2012, the province of La Union passed an ordinance recognizing Ilocano (Iloko) as an official provincial language alongside Filipino and English, as national and official languages of the Philippines, respectively.

Small populations of indigenous Cordilleran peoples, mostly Ibaloi, Kankanaey, and Bago, live in ancestral domain areas in the mountainous parts of Sudipen, Santol, San Gabriel, Bacnotan, Tubao, Pugo, Bagulin and Burgos. They have experienced historical displacement, such as the when they were expelled from the Mount Shontoug area in Pugo to make way for the construction Marcos bust.

According to the Philippine Statistics Authority report in 2012, the province has the longest life expectancy in the country at 78.3 years.

Economy

)

According to the Philippine Statistics Authority, La Union had a Human Development Index (HDI) of 0.687 in 2012;  0.615 in 2009; and 0.587 in 2006.

Currently, 80% of the income of the province comes from San Juan.

Industries and products 
La Union's economy is diversified with service, cottage industries, and agricultural industries spread throughout the province. The Port of San Fernando operates as an increasingly active shipping point, and the former American airbase Wallace Air Station, having been converted into a business and industrial area, helps to facilitate such commercial activity.

La Union is known for its indigenous textile dried fish, woodcarving, and soft broom industries, as well as its booming tourism sector.

The major products of the province include hand-woven blankets (Inabel), soft brooms, baskets, pottery, rice wine (tapuey), sugarcane wine (basi), sugarcane vinegar (sukang Iloco), wood craft, bamboo craft, native rice cakes, antique-finish furniture, dried fish, coconuts, sea urchins, malunggay and pebble stones.

Infrastructure

Power

Distribution

Education
La Union has 333 public elementary schools, 56 private elementary schools, 79 public high schools, 51 private secondary schools, 20 Colleges and 5 State Universities.

Colleges

Saint Louis College La Union
Union Christian College
AMA Computer College – La Union Campus
Lorma Colleges
CICOSAT Colleges
Northern Philippines College for Maritime Science and Technology
STI College La Union
Saint John Bosco College of Northern Luzon
Sea and Sky Colleges
La Finn's Scholastica
Sta. Veronica Colleges
South Ilocandia College of Arts and Technology
La Union College of Science and Technology
La Union Christian Comprehensive College
Agoo Computer Colleges
Polytechnic College of La Union
Philippine Central College of Arts, Science and Technology

Universities
Don Mariano Marcos Memorial State University-MID La Union Campus (MLUC)
Don Mariano Marcos Memorial State University-North La Union Campus Don (NLUC)
Don Mariano Marcos Memorial State University-South La Union Campus (SLUC)
Don Mariano Marcos Memorial State University-Open Uviversity

Provincial government and politics

Just as the national government, La Union provincial government is divided into three branches: executive, legislative, and judiciary. The judicial branch is administered solely by the Supreme Court of the Philippines. The LGUs have control of the executive and legislative branches.

The executive branch is composed of the governor for the provinces, the mayor for the cities and municipalities, and the barangay captain for the barangays.

The legislative branch is composed of the Sangguniang Panlalawigan (provincial assembly) for the provinces, Sangguniang Panlungsod (city assembly) for the cities, Sangguniang Bayan (town assembly) for the municipalities, Sangguniang Barangay (barangay council), and the Sangguniang Kabataan for the youth sector.

The seat of government is vested upon the mayor and other elected officers who hold office at the City Hall of San Fernando. The Sangguniang Bayan is the center of legislation, stationed in the Speaker Pro-Tempore Francisco I. Ortega Building, the Legislative Building at the back of the Capitol.

Elected officials
La Union is governed by Francisco Emmanuel "Pacoy" R. Ortega III, the chief executive, his vice governor, Mario Ortega, and 13 board members.

Governors

American colonization
Lucino Almeida (1901)
Don Joaquin Joaquino Ortega (1901–1904)
Joaquin Luna (1904–1907)
Sixto Zandueta (1907–1909)
Francisco Zandueta (1909–1912)
Mauro Ortiz (1912–1916)
Tomas de Guzman (1916)
Mauro Ortiz (1916–1918)
Pio Ancheta (1918–1921)
Thomas de Guzman (1922–1923)
Juan Lucero (1923–1928)
Thomas de Guzman (1928–1931)
Pio Ancheta (1931)
Mauro Ortiz (1931–1934)
Juan Rivera (1934–1937)
Francisco Nisce, (1937–1940)
Bernardo Gapuz (1940)

Japanese occupation
 Jorge Camacho (1941–1942)
 Bonifacio Tadiar (1942–1944)

Postwar and present eras
Agaton Yaranon (1946–1947)
Doroteo Aguila (1948–1951)
Juan Carbonell (1952–1955)
Bernardo Gapuz (1956–1959)
Eulogio de Guzman, (1960–1967)
Juvenal Guerrero (1968–1977)
Tomas Asprer, (1977–1986)
Robert V. Dulay (1986–1987)
Joaquin Ortega (1988–1992)
Justo O. Orros (1992–2001)
Victor F. Ortega, (2001–2007)
Manuel C. Ortega (2007–2016)
Francisco Emmanuel R. Ortega III, (2016–2022)
Raphaelle Veronica Ortega-David (2022–present)

Court system

The Supreme Court of the Philippines recognizes La Union (inter alia) regional trial courts and metropolitan or municipal trial courts within the province and towns that have an overall jurisdiction in the populace of the province and towns, respectively.

Batas Pambansa Blg. 129, "The Judiciary Reorganization Act of 1980", as amended, created Regional, Metropolitan, Municipal Trial and Circuit Courts. The Third Judicial Region includes RTCs in La Union xxx Sec. 14. Regional Trial Courts. (a) Fifty-seven Regional Trial Judges shall be commissioned for the First Judicial Region.  Nine branches (Branches XXVI to XXXIV) for the province of La Union, Branches XXVI to XXX with seats at San Fernando, Branches XXXI and XXXII at Agoo, Branch XXXIII at Bauang, and Branch XXXIV at Balaoan;

The law also created Metropolitan Trial Courts in each metropolitan area established by law, a Municipal Trial Court in each of the other cities or municipalities, and a Municipal Circuit Trial Court in each circuit comprising such cities and/or municipalities as are grouped together pursuant to law: three branches for Cabanatuan City; in every city which does not form part of a metropolitan area, there is also a Municipal Trial Court with one branch, except as provided: Two branches for San Fernando, La Union;

The courts of law are stationed in Halls of Justices of the Province and towns.  In La Union, the Regional Trial Court is stationed at the Bulwagan ng Katarungan or Halls of Justice in San Fernando, La Union and other Regional Trial Courts in Bauang and Agoo, La Union.

Notable people
 Magnolia Antonino (1915–2010) – former Senator of the Philippines
 Manuel Arguilla (1911–1944) – writer, patriot, and martyr
 Jose D. Aspiras – 1st Secretary of the Department of Tourism and former congressman
 Fortunato Abat –  20th Secretary of the Department of National Defense (DND), Ambassador to the People's Republic of China, and Commanding General of the Philippine Army.
 Clare R. Baltazar (born 1927) – National Scientist of the Philippines for Systematic Entomology
 Edward Barber — Filipino-British actor and host who came to prominence in 2016 Pinoy Big Brother: Lucky 7, 4th placed. from Aringay, La Union.
 Rolando Joselito Bautista – retired Filipino lieutenant general and 26th Secretary of Social Welfare and Development
 Carlo Biado (born 1983) — Filipino Athlete and professional pool player “2021 US Open Pool Grand Champion”. from Rosario, La Union.
 Rafael Buenaventura – Governor of the Bangko Sentral ng Pilipinas
 Carina Cariño — Miss Millennial 2017 1st Runner up, Binibining Pilipinas La Union. from Agoo, La Union.
 Roger Casugay — Filipino surfer who competed for the Philippines at the 2019 Southeast Asian Games gold medalist. He is the first Filipino to receive the Pierre de Coubertin Act of Fair Play Award of the International Fair Play Committee in recognition of saving a competitor in longboard semifinals of the 2019 Southeast Asian Games. from the City of San Fernando, La Union.
 Anacleto Diaz (1878–1945) – 31st Associate Justice of the Supreme Court of the Philippines
 Gloria Diaz (born 1951) – Miss Philippines 1969, Miss Universe 1969, Actress, from Aringay, La Union.
 Samuel Gaerlan – 187th Associate Justice of the Supreme Court of the Philippines
 Coleen Garcia — is a Filipino actress, host, and model. from the City of San Fernando, La Union.
 Cheska Garcia Kramer — is a Filipino actress and model. from Bauang, La Union
 Paolo Gallardo — Mister Grand International 2019 2nd Runner-up. from the City of San Fernando, La Union.
 Lucrecia Roces Kasilag (1918 2008) – National Artist of the Philippines for Music
Mario Lopez — 185th Associate Justice of the Supreme Court of the Philippines
 Antonio Mabutas – Agoo-born first bishop of Diocese of Laoag and the second Archbishop of the Archdiocese of Davao, historically noted as the first Roman Catholic Archbishop to write a pastoral letter to criticize human rights violations under the Marcos dictatorship.
 JB Magsaysay (born 1980) – Pinoy Big Brother (season 1) housemate; actor, public servant, and businessman. from San Juan, La Union.
José B. Nísperos (1887–1922) First Asian and Filipino to win US Medal of Honor
 Doña Laureana Novicio Luna y Ancheta (July 4, 1836 – August 18, 1906) — Mother of Antonio Luna and Juan Luna.
 Bienvenido Nebres (born 1940) – academic, National Scientist of the Philippines for Mathematics, former Provincial Superior of the Society of Jesus in the Philippines
Ashley Ortega — is a Filipino-German actress well known for her roles in Dormitoryo and My Destiny on GMA Network. She is formerly a co-host of the variety show Wowowin. from the City of San Fernando, La Union.
 Camilo Osias (1889–1976) – Filipino politician, 6th and 8th President of the Senate of the Philippines.
 Wenceslao Padilla –  Filipino Scheut priest who from 2 August 2003 was the Apostolic prefect of the Apostolic Prefecture of Ulaanbaatar, a diocese of the Roman Catholic Church in Mongolia.
 Armando "Mandrake" Ducusin Palabay (1953–1974) - Filipino student leader and activist from San Fernando La Union, honored at the Philippines' Bantayog ng mga Bayani as a martyr of the resistance against the Marcos dictatorship.
 Diego Silang (1730–1763) – a revolutionary leader.
 Jessica Soho — Multi-awarded (Asia Journalist of All Times,  Peabody Award) Filipina broadcast journalist dubbed as the Asia's Powerhouse Journalist and known as the host of the news magazine program Kapuso Mo, Jessica Soho on GMA Network and formerly anchored the newscast State of the Nation with Jessica Soho on GMA News TV.
 Vice Ganda  – Singer, actor, comedian and host. from San Juan, La Union.

References

External links

 
 
 Official Website of the Provincial Government of La Union
 Philippine Standard Geographic Code

 
Provinces of the Philippines
Provinces of the Ilocos Region
States and territories established in 1850
1850 establishments in the Philippines